Cleveland railway station was a former railway station on Queensland Rail suburban network in Brisbane, the state capital of Queensland, Australia. It was the second terminus of the Cleveland railway line and the second of three stations to be known as "Cleveland".

It opened in 1897 with the opening of the extension beyond the original Cleveland station.

The station closed in 1960 with the closure of the railway beyond Lota. The site of the station is now part of Linear Park.

When the railway was reopened in 1987, the former Raby Bay station became the new terminus and the third Cleveland railway station.

References

Disused railway stations in Queensland